Phúc Trạch is a rural commune (xã) and village in Hương Khê District, Hà Tĩnh Province, in Vietnam.

Populated places in Hà Tĩnh province
Communes of Hà Tĩnh province